Jürgen Ohlsen (15 March 1917 – 23 September 1994) was a German actor best remembered for portraying "Heini "Quex" Völker" in the 1933  Nazi propaganda film Hitlerjunge Quex (Our Flag Leads Us Forward).

Career
Ohlsen was born in Schöneberg, Berlin, Germany on 15 March 1917. Due to the illness of actor Hermann Braun, Ohlsen inherited the leading role of Heini Völker (nicknamed 'Quex') in Hitlerjunge Quex (Our Flag Leads Us Forward, 1933). Units of the Berlin Hitler Youth also joined the cast of the film. Ohlsen himself was only credited as Ein Hitlerjunge (a Hitler Youth member). The film, based on the popular propaganda novel Der Hitlerjunge Quex, which was in turned based on the real-life murder of Hitler Youth member Herbert Norkus, was highly successful in Germany at the time. 

Ohlsen joined the Hitler Youth in 1934 when the Nazis dissolved Berlin's Der Jungenbund Südlegion , of which he was a member.  He appears not to have taken the Party's anti-Semitic position seriously, for in 1935 he was disciplined for repeatedly playing tennis with a Jew. 

At the time, BBC broadcasts into Germany routinely spread scandalous stories about Nazi officials and other  German  public figures. One of these stories alleged that Ohlsen was a homosexual and the lover of Hitler Youth leader Baldur von Schirach. The rumor caught on in Germany and by at least the fall of 1938, the verb "quexen" (literally "to quex") had entered the Hitler Youth vocabulary as a euphemism for homosexual intercourse.

In 1935, Ohlsen played the role of a supporter of aviator Ernst Udet in Heinz Paul's Wunder des Fliegens (Wonder of Flying). His acting career subsequently ended and by 1940 he was no longer a public figure.

Later years and death
After he reached adulthood, Ohlsen was deemed suspicious by the Nazi regime. According to a report by the Osnabrück Gestapo, during 1940 or 1941 it was considered to send him to a concentration camp where he would have been killed. 

After World War II, Ohlsen led a private life. He died on 23 September 1994 at the age of 77 in Düsseldorf.

Filmography
 Hitlerjunge Quex: Ein Film vom Opfergeist der deutschen Jugend also known as Our Flag Leads Us Forward. (1933; 95 mins.) Directed by Hans Steinhoff.  Ohlsen played the starring role of Heini Völker.  Title translation:  Hitler Youth Quex. A Film of the Sacrifice of German Youth.
 Alle Macht mit (1933; 6 mins)  Directed by Franz Wenzler 
 Miracle of Flight (1935; 79 mins.) Directed by Heinz Paul  Ohlsen played the role of Heinz Muthesius.  German ace Ernst Udet starred in this film.

References

Sources
Baird, Jay W. (1992). To Die for Germany: Heroes in the Nazi Pantheon.
 Buscher, Paulus (1998) Das Stigma. Koblenz 
 Chiari, Bernhard, Matthias Rogg, and Wolfgang Schmidt, eds. Krieg und Militär im Film des 20. Jahrhunderts. Oldenbourg Verlag, 2003.  
Gillespie, William (2022). Hitler Youth Quex – A Guide for the English–speaking Reader, German Films Dot Net, Potts Point, NSW, Australia, ISBN 978–0–980–8612–7–3
 
 "Perfect Youth: Irks Nazis By Associating With Jew."  New York Times, August 23, 1935, p. 9. (Subscription only)

Rentschler, Eric (1993) Emotional engineering: Hitler youth Quex. Center for German and European Studies, University of California,
 Rentschler, Eric (1996)  The Ministry of Illusion: Nazi Cinema and Its Afterlife.  Cambridge, MA: Harvard University Press 
 Steinwascher, Gerd, ed. Gestapo  Osnabrück meldet--: Polizei- und Regierungsberichte aus dem Regierungsbezirk Osnabrück aus den Jahren 1933 bis 1936. Osnabrück, Germany: Selbstverlag des Vereins für Geschichte und Landeskunde von Osnabrück, 1995, p. 267, Entry No. 29. 
 Holmstrom, John. The Moving Picture Boy: An International Encyclopaedia from 1895 to 1995, Norwich, Michael Russell, 1996, p. 95.

External links 
 Jürgen Ohlsen at Filmportal.de
 

1917 births
1994 deaths
20th-century German male actors
Burials in Germany
German male child actors
German male film actors
Hitler Youth members
Male actors from Berlin
Nazi propagandists
People of the Weimar Republic